Rock Fountain Court Historic District, also known as Melinda Court, is a historic traveler's accommodation and national historic district located at Springfield, Greene County, Missouri. The district encompasses 10 contributing buildings and 1 contributing structure associated with a tourist court. The district developed between about 1945 and 1952, and includes 9 tourist cabins and a large frame garage. The cabins are of frame construction and faced in masonry ranging from all dark sandstone, to white limestone accented with red brick.

It was added to the National Register of Historic Places in 2003.

References

Historic districts on the National Register of Historic Places in Missouri
Hotel buildings on the National Register of Historic Places in Missouri
Buildings and structures in Springfield, Missouri
National Register of Historic Places in Greene County, Missouri